From the Mixed-Up Files of Mrs. Basil E. Frankweiler (released as: The Hideaways in Home video releases) is a 1973 American children's film based on E.L. Konigsburg's novel From the Mixed-Up Files of Mrs. Basil E. Frankweiler.  It tells the story of a girl and her brother who run away from home to live in the New York Metropolitan Museum of Art and discover what they think is a lost treasure. For home video releases, the film was retitled The Hideaways.

Plot
The movie, following the plot of the book by the same name, starts with young teenager Claudia Kinkaid feeling unappreciated at her home in New Jersey, so she decides to run away, taking along her younger brother Jamie. They run away to New York City, and end up at the Metropolitan Museum of Art. They stay in the museum for several nights, sleeping in beds featured in the museum, hiding from museum guards, and bathing in the fountain. For money, they grab coins out of the bottom of the fountain and use them to get food out of the vending machine. Eventually, Claudia finds a statue of an angel she believes was carved by Michelangelo, so she decides to find the previous owner of the statue. This owner, Mrs. Basil E. Frankweiler, tells Claudia and Jamie that she will leave them the secret of the angel statue in her will if they give her a full account of their adventure.

Cast
 Ingrid Bergman as Mrs. Frankweiler
 Sally Prager as Claudia Kincaid
 Johnny Doran as Jamie Kincaid
 George Rose as Saxonburg
 Georgann Johnson as Mrs. Kincaid
 Richard Mulligan as Mr. Kincaid
 Madeline Kahn as Schoolteacher
 Bruce Conover as Kevin Kincaid
 Mike Hammett as Brucie
 Donald Symington as Museum director
 Linda Selman as Museum secretary

Filming locations
Filming locations included The Metropolitan Museum of Art, The New York General Post Office, Macy's New York, the Erie Lackawanna Railway and Madison, New Jersey.

Specific Metropolitan Museum of Art galleries included: 
Gallery 507: Bedroom from the Palazzo Sagredo of Venice,
Gallery 162: Currently Greek and Roman hall (but at time of filming was the restaurant),
Gallery 153: Greek and Roman Hall,
Gallery 305: Medieval Hall,
Gallery 371: Arms and Armor,
Gallery 206: Chinese Art,
Egyptian Wing,
British period rooms, and The Great Hall.

Other adaptations
From the Mixed-Up Files of Mrs. Basil E. Frankweiler was adapted into a 1995 television movie starring Lauren Bacall.

Notes
According to IMDb, the movie is referenced in the film The Royal Tenenbaums.

This movie was also mentioned in Season 1 Episode 3 of Mr. Robot.

See also
 List of American films of 1973

References

External links
 
 
 
 
 
 

1973 films
American children's films
Films based on American novels
Films based on children's books
Films directed by Fielder Cook
Films set in New York City
Films set in museums
Films shot in New Jersey
Films shot in New York City
Metropolitan Museum of Art
Troma Entertainment films
1970s English-language films
1970s American films